was an Okinawan martial arts master who formed Yamani ryu. He taught Bōjutsu privately at his home in the village of Tobaru, in Shuri, Okinawa.

Life 

Like many martial arts masters Chinen had been a policeman. During the Second World War he lived with the martial arts master Horoku Ishikawa in Tainan, Taiwan. He also worked at the Shuri City Hall in Shuri, Okinawa.

Yamani Ryu Bōjutsu 

Chinen named the style after his father Sanra Chinen who was also a teacher of Bōjutsu and known as Yamani Usumei and Yamane Tanmei.

Legacy 

Although the style ceased to exist after his death, some of his katas were preserved by Seitoku Higa of the Bugeikan and Shūgorō Nakazato of Shōrin-ryū. Another student of Chinen's, Chōgi Kishaba and his student Toshihiro Ōshiro also privately practised Yamani Ryu katas. Ōshiro teaches Bōjutsu today, and so does Chinen's grandnephew Teruo Chinen.

See also 

Okinawan martial arts

References

Further reading

External links 
 Interview with Teruo Chinen (Masami Chinen's grandnephew) (as of May 21, 2018.)
 Chinen Masami and "Sakugawa no kon" (bojutsu) archived February 17, 2015.

Okinawan male karateka
1898 births
1976 deaths
Ryukyuan people
Shōrin-ryū practitioners